Natale is a village in Central District of Botswana. The village is located 30 km west of Francistown, and it has a primary school, a kgotla and a Health post.

The population counted 1,117 in the 2001 census.

See also 
Mathangwane

References 

Populated places in Central District (Botswana)
Villages in Botswana